The 2009 Asian Men's Club Volleyball Championship was the 10th staging of the AVC Club Championships. The tournament was held in Dubai, United Arab Emirates.

Pools composition
The teams are seeded based on their final ranking at the 2008 Asian Men's Club Volleyball Championship.

* Withdrew

 Preliminary round 
Pool A

|}

|}

Pool B

|}

|}

Pool C

|}

|}

Pool D

|}

|}

 Quarterfinals 
 The results and the points of the matches between the same teams that were already played during the preliminary round shall be taken into account for the Quarterfinals.''

Pool E

|}

|}

Pool F

|}

|}

Pool G

|}

Pool H

|}

|}

Classification 9th–12th

Semifinals

|}

11th place

|}

9th place

|}

Classification 5th–8th

Semifinals

|}

7th place

|}

5th place

|}

Final round

Semifinals

|}

3rd place

|}

Final

|}

Final standing

Awards
MVP:  Hicham Guemmadi (Al-Nasr)
Best Scorer:  Farhad Nazari Afshar (Paykan)
Best Server:  Igor Omrčen (Al-Arabi)
Best Spiker:  Ahmed Al-Bakhit (Al-Hilal)
Best Blocker:  Ibrahim Mohammed (Al-Arabi)
Best Setter:  Khaled Al-Hosni (Al-Nasr)
Best Libero:  Farhad Zarif (Paykan)

References
Asian Volleyball Confederation

2009 Asian Men's Club Volleyball Championship
A
Asian Mens Club Volleyball Championship, 2009
International volleyball competitions hosted by the United Arab Emirates